The 1918 Washington State football team was an American football team that represented Washington State College as an independent during the 1918 college football season, after being a member of the Pacific Coast Conference (PCC) in 1917. The team competed under head coach Emory Alvord, compiling a record of 1–1.  The team rejoined the PCC in 1919.  The 1919 team also notably adopted the "Cougars" nickname.

Schedule

References

Washington State
Washington State Cougars football seasons
Washington State football